Exochorda racemosa, the pearlbush or common pearlbush, is a species of plant in the family Rosaceae. This species is mostly found in China and Japan.

Taxonomy and etymology

Exochorda racemosa was first described by John Lindley. It is placed in the genus Exochorda and family Rosaceae, the rose family.  The plant gets its common name, "common pearlbush", from its pearl-looking flowers.

Description

A loose, irregular or vase-shaped and upright shrub, this species is deciduous. The flowers are white, and flower in late April to early May. The flowers have round petals, 12-25 stamens, borne in racemes in groups of about six or ten. Flowers give way to brown, dehiscent seed capsules.

Subspecies
 Exochorda racemosa subsp. serratifolia (S.Moore) F.Y.Gao & Maesen – Korean pearl bush

References

Exochordeae
Plants described in 1847